The Superman/Batman Adventures is a television series that aired on USA Network in 1995. It was later aired on Cartoon Network and Boomerang. The episodes were edited from various seasons of the Hanna-Barbera-produced Super Friends, as well as Filmation's 1960s series The New Adventures of Superman, The Superman/Aquaman Hour of Adventure, and The Batman/Superman Hour. 

The Superman/Batman Adventures included for the first time on American television the "lost episodes" of the 1983–1984 season of Super Friends.

Cast

Main cast

Major antagonists

Supporting characters

See also
The New Batman/Superman Adventures

References

American children's animated action television series
American children's animated adventure television series
American children's animated superhero television series
Animated Superman television series
Super Friends
Animated Justice League television series
Animated television shows based on DC Comics
DC Comics animated television series by Filmation
Television series by Warner Bros. Television Studios
1990s American animated television series
1995 American television series debuts
1997 American television series endings
Batman television series by Filmation
Television series by Hanna-Barbera
USA Action Extreme Team